Tamassint is a village in Al Hoceïma Province, Tanger-Tetouan-Al Hoceima, Morocco. According to the 2004 census it has a population of 1788.

References

Populated places in Al Hoceïma Province